Mark Merenda (born 29 October 1975) is a former Australian rules footballer who played in the Australian Football League (AFL).

Merenda began his career with the West Perth Football Club in the West Australian Football League (WAFL).

Debuting in 1994 with the Richmond Football Club, he was noted as a midfielder or small forward. At the end of the 2000 season, after being out of action at Richmond from Round 2 onwards, he was moved to his home state to play with the West Coast Eagles after 75 games with the Tigers. In 2001 he kicked the Goal of the Year in Round 3 against St Kilda.

Back injuries plagued Merenda throughout his career and he was forced to retire at the end of the 2002 season. He is now involved with coaching at Claremont Football Club.

Mark Merenda is of Sicilian descent.

References

 Hogan P: The Tigers Of Old, Richmond FC, Melbourne 1996

External links

Living people
West Perth Football Club players
Richmond Football Club players
West Coast Eagles players
1975 births
Australian rules footballers from Western Australia
Australian people of Sicilian descent
Western Australian State of Origin players